Current River State Park is a public recreation area occupying more than  of land along the Current River north of Eminence in Newton Township, Shannon County, Missouri.  The state park consists of land and buildings originally developed as the Alton Club, a corporate retreat used in the 1930s and 1940s by the Alton Box Board Company of Alton, Illinois. Rustic buildings associated with the Alton Club were added to the National Register of Historic Places in 2005.

Activities and amenities
The park offers fishing and boating on two small lakes, picnicking facilities,  of hiking trails, and tours of the historic buildings. It is open on weekends during warm weather months.

References

External links

Current River State Park Missouri Department of Natural Resources

State parks of Missouri
Protected areas of Shannon County, Missouri
Protected areas established in 2007
2007 establishments in Missouri